The results of the 2018 Little League World Series were determined between August 16 and August 26, 2018 in South Williamsport, Pennsylvania. 16 teams were divided into two groups, one with eight teams from the United States and another with eight international teams, with both groups playing a modified double-elimination tournament. In each group, the last remaining undefeated team faced the last remaining team with one loss, with the winners of those games advancing to play for the Little League World Series championship.

Double-elimination stage

United States

Winner's bracket

Game 2: New York 5, Iowa 2

Game 4: Texas 3, Rhode Island 1

Game 6: Michigan 5, Idaho 4

Game 8: Hawaii 2, Georgia 0

Game 14: New York 2, Texas 1

Game 16: Hawaii 8, Michigan 3

Game 24: Hawaii 10, New York 0

Loser's bracket

Game 10: Iowa 9, Rhode Island 5

Game 12: Georgia 3, Idaho 0

Game 18: Michigan 5, Iowa 4

Game 20: Georgia 7, Texas 6

Game 22: Georgia 4, Michigan 3

Game 26: Georgia 7, New York 3

International

Winner's bracket

Game 1: South Korea 4, Puerto Rico 2

Game 3: Mexico 3, Australia 2

Game 5: Japan 11, Spain 1

Game 7: Panama 8, Canada 3

Game 13: South Korea 5, Mexico 1

Game 15: Japan 4, Panama 2

Game 23: South Korea 10, Japan 0

Loser's bracket

Game 9: Puerto Rico 6, Australia 0

Game 11: Canada 2, Spain 1

Game 17: Puerto Rico 3, Panama 1

Game 19: Canada 6, Mexico 4

Game 21: Puerto Rico 9, Canada 4

Game 25: Japan 1, Puerto Rico 0

Consolation games

Game A: Rhode Island 15, Australia 0

Game B: Idaho 5, Spain 0

Single-elimination stage

International championship: South Korea 2, Japan 1

United States championship: Hawaii 3, Georgia 0

Third place game: Japan 8, Georgia 2

World championship game: Hawaii 3, South Korea 0

References

External links
Full schedule from littleleague.org

2018 Little League World Series